Albania is a country rich in petroleum and gas resources both on and offshore. The following is a list of oil and gas fields that are located in the country.

Oil and Gas fields

See also

List of oil and gas fields of the North Sea

References

Economy of Albania-related lists

Albania